Joseph Adebayo Adelakun (born June 12, 1949) is a Nigerian gospel singer, songwriter and televangelist.

Early life
Adelakun was born into the family of Salami Adebayo who was a Muslim.
He hails from Saki a town situated in the northern part of Oyo State, western Nigeria. 
He was trained as Electrical engineer at Kareem Electrical Engineering Company in the city of Ibadan, the capital of Oyo State.
Having completed his training in 1968, he joined the Nigerian Army and was deployed to the Nigerian Army Barrack, the Engineering Construction Regiment at Ede in Oyo State.
He was baptized at Christ Apostolic Church in 1972, the same year he began his evangelism.

Career
In 1976, he was transferred to Kaduna where his musical career began as a member of the Christ Apostolic Church  choir.
His debut album titled Emi yio kokiki Re was released in 1978 and in 1982, he retired from the Nigerian Army to focus on gospel music, the same year he established a musical group called "Ayewa International Gospel Singers".
His was famous for his 9th album titled Amona tete maa bo, released in 1984. 
He had released over 30 musical album over the years as a Nigerian gospel singer.
He was honoured with the "Evergreen Award" at the Crystal Awards 2014 held on Sunday, July 20, 2014.

Discography
Amona Tete Maa Bo (1984)
Abundant Grace 
Gboro Mi Ro (Re-Mix) Evergreen 
Agbara Olorun Ki I Baati
	
Emi yio kokiki Re        Vol 1
Okan mi Bale             Vol 2
Emmanuel ti de           Vol 3
Amona tete mabo (1)      Vol 4 	 	
Eyin Omo Igbala Edide      Vol 5 	 	Bami se Jesu               Vol 6
Bere Ohun Edun Okan re   Vol 7
Emi yio fiyin f'Oluwa    Vol 8
Amona tete mabo (2)      Vol 9
Agbara Olorun Ki I Baati Vol 10	
Gboro mi rot             Vol 11
Ilekun Anu               Vol 12

See also
 List of Nigerian gospel musicians

References

Living people
1949 births
Musicians from Oyo State
Nigerian gospel singers
Yoruba musicians
Yoruba-language singers
Nigerian television evangelists
20th-century Nigerian musicians
21st-century Nigerian musicians
Yoruba Christian clergy